The Commercial Bank of Tasmania, the second oldest bank in Australia, was established in 1832 with its head office in Macquarie Street, Hobart. A branch was opened in Launceston in August 1838.

The early records that survive are only the original deed of settlement of 1832 and records of a special meeting in 1839. The shareholders appear to have regarded their business as a private matter.

It was sold with its 18 branch offices to the English, Scottish and Australian Bank in April 1921.

References

Banks established in 1832
Australian companies established in 1832
Banks of Tasmania
Defunct banks of Australia